Alpha Group International (formerly Alpha FX plc) is a foreign exchange market manager and service provider publicly traded on the Alternative Investment Market (AIM). The organisation splits its operations between risk management and alternative banking solutions.

Its risk management arm assists small to medium-sized enterprises in managing currency volatility.

Its alternative banking solutions help firms manage high-volume transactions and open local currency accounts.

The organisation's CEO, Morgan Tillbrook, founded the organisation in 2010.

The group began live trading its shares on London's AIM and obtained its regulatory license from the United Kingdom's Financial Conduct Authority (FCA) shortly after.

In 2022, the organisation hired Tim Powell as its chief financial officer, and gained a regulatory license in Australia.

References